Brlog is a village in the municipality of Pirot, Serbia.

Other meanings of Brlog include:

People
Paul Puhallo von Brlog (1856–1926), Croatian Austro-Hungarian general

Places
 Brlog, Krško, a settlement in the Municipality of Krško in Slovenia
 Brlog, Otočac, a village in Otočac municipality in Lika-Senj County, Croatia
 Brlog, Sodražica, a settlement in the Municipality of Sodražica in Slovenia
 Brlog, Velike Lašče, a settlement in the Municipality of Velike Lašče in Slovenia